The 2015–16 season of the Primera División de Fútbol Sala was the 27th season of top-tier futsal in Spain. It was the fifth season under the "Primera División" name. The regular season started on September 11, 2015, and ended on April 30, 2016. The championship playoffs followed the end of the regular season.

Inter Movistar are the defending champions by defeating ElPozo Murcia 3 games to 1 in the 2014–15 Championship Final series, winning its tenth title overall and second in a row.

Uruguay Tenerife and Prone Lugo finished in the last two places in the league and so were relegated at the end of the 2014-2015 regular season. UMA Antequera were crowned 2014-2015 champions of Segunda División de Futsal and were promoted automatically. Elche lost the promotion playoffs 2 games to 0 to CD Brihuega FS, but because of money issues Elche became the other team to be promoted to the Primera División for the 2015-2016 season.

Teams

Regular season

Standings

Results

Calendar

Bracket

Quarter-finals

1st match

2nd match

3rd match

Semifinals

1st match

2nd match

3rd match

Final

1st match

2nd match

3rd match

4th match

Statistics

Top scorers

Hat-tricks

Note
4 Player scored 4 goals5 Player scored 5 goals

See also
2015–16 Segunda División de Futsal

References

2015–16
2015–16 in Spanish futsal
Spain